David Consuegra Uribe (1939-2004) was a Colombian graphic designer and illustrator. He created dozens of logos for Colombian institutions, such as Inravisión, the Colombian Liberal Party, and the Bogotá Museum of Modern Art. He was also a visiting professor at Virginia Commonwealth University and the University of Barcelona.

Early life and education 
David was born in Bucaramanga. He traveled to the United States at sixteen to study fine arts at Boston University, graduating cum laude in 1961. Afterwards, he graduated from Yale University in 1963 and won an award for his thesis, "On Trademarks". He also worked with Paul Rand at his New York studio.

Career 
David returned to Colombia in 1963. There he taught as a professor at Universidad de los Andes and Universidad Nacional. In 1964, the Bogotá Museum of Modern Art hired him as a graphic designer, where he would go on to design their logo. He founded Colombia's first graphic design program at Universidad Jorge Tadeo Lozano in 1967.

His career continued to balance graphic design and teaching. He participated in Universidad Nacional's advertising design contests in 1966, 1977, and 1982. Universidad Nacional designated him professor emeritus in 1990. He was a visiting professor at Virginia Commonwealth University in 1984, and University of Barcelona in 1998. In 1994, he joined Belgium's International Trademark Center.

Consuegra died of a heart attack in Mexico City in October 2004 while participating as a judge in a poster contest.

Published works 
He was the author of numerous books, including a history of art and a treatise on typography. In 1964 he founded the magazine Nova. Four years later in 1968 he founded the magazine Acteón. He also published a translation and edit of Rudolf Koch's The Book of Signs.

Bibliography 

 The Twenty-Six Letters (1964)
 In Search of the Square (1992)
 Classic Typefaces
 On Trademarks (1971)
 Theory & Practice of Graphic Design (1982-1986, series of 7 issues)
 ABC of World Trademarks (1988)
 American Type Design & Designers (2004)

Famous works

Achievements and legacy 
David Consuegra stands out for creating many logos. Some of his most famous logos include the Museum of Modern Art of Bogotá, Inravisión, Artesanías de Colombia, the Industrial University of Santander, and the Federation of Rice Growers.

Consuegra also won a design contest hosted by Colombia's National Tourism Corporation. He designed a spiral of yellow, blue and red, which he presented under the name El sol de Colombia por el mundo. He held his last exhibition, Comics, in April 1994 at the National University. Consuegra also represented Latin America at the World Logo Design Biennial in Brussels, Belgium.

References

External links
Biography from the Asociación de Diseñadores Gráficos de Colombia 
David Consuegra in ColArte  

1939 births
2004 deaths
Colombian graphic designers
Colombian illustrators
People from Bucaramanga
Boston University alumni